The purpose of Great Smoky Mountains Association (GSMA) is to help the Great Smoky Mountains National Park. Through sales, labor, donations, and volunteer efforts, GSMA provides the National Park Service with additional tools for fulfilling its mission.

Great Smoky Mountains Association is a nonprofit organization authorized by Congress to support the Park's educational, scientific, and historical programs. Its mission is to enhance public enjoyment and understanding of the Great Smoky Mountains National Park.

To accomplish this goal, GSMA participates in a variety of activities that include: distribution and publication of educational books and guides, funding visitor center exhibits and artifact collections, sponsoring free historic demonstrations and festivals, funding the Park's library, and helping to fund the environmental education program at the Institute at Tremont. Since its creation in March 1953, GSMA has contributed over $30 million in aid to the Park, including the $3,000,000 in construction costs for the Oconaluftee Visitor Center, opened in April 2011.

See also

 Wildflowers of the Great Smoky Mountains
 Cassius Cash

External links
Great Smoky Mountains Association Home Page
 Great Smoky Mountains National Park

Environmental organizations based in the United States
Environmental organizations based in Tennessee